Balgari Nunatak (‘Nunatak Balgari’ \'nu-na-tak 'b&l-ga-ri\) is the mostly ice-fee rocky ridge extending 800 m in east–west direction and 550 m wide, rising to 282 m on the south side of Bongrain Ice Piedmont in northern Alexander Island, Antarctica. It surmounts Lazarev Bay to the south. The nunatak was visited on 3 January 1988 by the geological survey party of Christo Pimpirev and Borislav Kamenov (First Bulgarian Antarctic Expedition), and Philip Nell and Peter Marquis (British Antarctic Survey). On that occasion, a small rocky offshoot situated 360 m southeast of the nunatak's summit was designated as the site for a future Bulgarian Antarctic base.  However, the two prefabricated huts brought for the purpose on board the Soviet Research Ship Mikhail Somov in April 1988 could not be helicoptered ashore due to bad weather, and were erected on Livingston Island instead.

The feature is so named in connection with the first choice of a site for the Bulgarian Antarctic base.

Location

Maps
 British Antarctic Territory.  Scale 1:250000 topographic map.  Sheet SR19-20/5.  APC UK, 1991
 Antarctic Digital Database (ADD). Scale 1:250000 topographic map of Antarctica. Scientific Committee on Antarctic Research (SCAR). Since 1993, regularly upgraded and updated

Notes

References
 Bulgarian Antarctic Gazetteer. Antarctic Place-names Commission. (details in Bulgarian, basic data in English)
 Balgari Nunatak. SCAR Composite Gazetteer of Antarctica

External links
 Balgari Nunatak. Adjusted Copernix satellite image

Nunataks of Alexander Island
Bulgaria and the Antarctic